Tobias Jänicke (born 16 March 1989) is a German professional footballer who plays as an attacking midfielder for 1. FC Saarbrücken.

References

External links

1989 births
Living people
German footballers
Association football midfielders
Germany youth international footballers
1. FC Neubrandenburg 04 players
FC Hansa Rostock players
Dynamo Dresden players
SV Wehen Wiesbaden players
1. FC Saarbrücken players
2. Bundesliga players
3. Liga players
Regionalliga players
People from Neubrandenburg
Footballers from Mecklenburg-Western Pomerania